, provisional designation , is a trans-Neptunian object in the outer regions of the Solar System, approximately 500 kilometers in diameter. It was discovered on 10 May 2007, by the U.S. Palomar Observatory in California. The team of unaccredited astronomers at Palomar consisted of Megan E. Schwamb, Michael E. Brown and David L. Rabinowitz

The minor planet orbits the Sun at a distance of 38.6–40.6 AU once every 249 years and 1 month (90,983 days). Its orbit has an eccentricity of 0.02 and an inclination of 18° with respect to the ecliptic.
The first precovery was taken at the Australian Siding Spring Observatory during the Digitized Sky Survey in 1984, extending the body's observation arc by 23 years prior to its discovery observation. It came to perihelion around 1888.

Orbital classification 

The Minor Planet Center lists  as a trans-Neptunian object or a distant object in the Kuiper belt. The Deep Ecliptic Survey currently shows it as a scattered object, based on a 10-million-year integration of the orbit.

References

External links 
 2007 JH43 Precovery Images
 

Scattered disc and detached objects
Discoveries by the Palomar Observatory
Possible dwarf planets
20070510